In differential geometry, the Henneberg surface is a non-orientable minimal surface named after Lebrecht Henneberg.

It has parametric equation

and can be expressed as an order-15 algebraic surface. It can be viewed as an immersion of a punctured projective plane. Up until 1981 it was the only known non-orientable minimal surface.

The surface contains a semicubical parabola ("Neile's parabola") and can be derived from solving the corresponding Björling problem.

References 

Minimal surfaces
Differential geometry